En mí may refer to:

 "En mí", a song by Marilina Bertoldi
 "En mí", a song by J Balvin from Vibras
 "En mí (interlude)", a song by J Balvin from Vibras
 "En mí", a song by Juan Wauters

See also